Imosca is a genus of moths of the family Noctuidae.

Species
 Imosca coreana (Matsumura, 1926)
 Imosca hoenei (Bang-Haas, 1927)
 Imosca sugii (Kobes, 1984)

References
Natural History Museum Lepidoptera genus database
Imosca at funet 

Hadeninae